Satitherapy is an integrative psychotherapy, which uses mindfulness (sati) as the key principle within a person centered approach developed by Carl R. Rogers. In this approach, it is the client who defines the goals of therapy and attains them with therapist's ethically skillful help (kusala). Satitherapy is grounded on respecting all life (ahimsa) and takes as its base the bodily anchored experiencing that is beyond the words. For this, it integrates the techniques of psychodrama developed by Jacob L. Moreno and expressive media for therapeutic acting-out, as well as the procedures of Buddhist insight meditation (satipatthána-vipassaná) and satidrama for therapeutic acting-in.

The theoretical training of satitherapists uses both the conceptual frame of Western psychology of mindfulness (cf. Germer, Siegel, Fulton, 2005; Didonna, 2009) and the system of psychology and ethics elaborated in the ancient Asian teachings of Abhidhamma (Frýba 1989; Frýba, 1996). Most of the practical skills and techniques are derived from the Abhidhamma. Thus the format of satitherapy includes theoretical knowledge and therapeutic skills from both Western and Asian sources.

There are two things unique to satitherapy:

the use of ethics as the explanatory principle of suffering and as the basic paradigm of skillful coping
the practical principle of skillful setting or removing of conditions (vatta-pativatta) so as to enable the upheaval of reality (dhamma-uddhacca) against the pathogenic wrong views (ditthi).
These two paradigms of satitherapy are derived from Abhidhamma and they are not found in any other psychotherapy, which was developed within Western Euro-American culture.

References
 Didonna, F. (2009): Clinical Handbook of Mindfulness. London, Springer.
 Fryba, M. (1989): The Art of Happiness: Teachings of Buddhist Psychology. Boston, Shambhala. 
 Fryba, M. (1996): The Practice of Happiness - Exercises & Techniques for Developing Mindfulness, Wisdom, and Joy. Boston, Shambhala. 
 Germer, Ch. K.; Siegel, R. D.; Fulton, P. R. (2005): Mindfulness and Psychotherapy. London, Guilford Press.
 Nemcova, M; Hajek, K. (2009): Introduction to Satitherapy – Mindfulness and Abhidhamma Principles in Person-Centered Integrative Psychotherapy. Morrisville, Lulu.com. 
 Vogt, B. (1998): Skill and Trust – The Tovil Healing Ritual of Sri Lanka as Culture-Specific Psychotherapy. Amsterdam, VU University Press.

External links

 Utilizing Abhidhamma principles in psychotherapy - Powerpoint presentation from the World Congress on Psychology & Spirituality, New Delhi, India, January 5–8, 2008
 Principles of Satitherapy, the seminal text on Satitherapy by its founder Dr. M. Frýba 

Psychotherapies
Integrative psychotherapy
Psychodrama
Mindfulness (psychology)